Waited Up 'til It Was Light is the debut album by British band Johnny Foreigner and was released on UK independent label Best Before Records on 2 June 2008. The album was licensed to Nettwerk by Best Before and released through online retailers in North America on 22 July 2008, and in stores on 23 September 2008. It was recorded in Hoboken, New Jersey with producer Machine, whose previous credits include work with notable contemporary hard rock acts including Lamb of God, Clutch, and King Crimson.  The artwork was designed by Lewes Herriot and showed several Birmingham landmarks, with the UK release having interchangeable covers. The title is a reference to the Casiotone for the Painfully Alone song "Don't They Have Payphones Wherever You Were Last Night".

A track-by-track explanation of the album from Alexei Berrow, guitarist and singer of the band, can be found here .

Track listing

The North American release contains a re-recording of Arcs Across the City track "Champagne Girls I Have Known" between "Lea Room" and "Our Bipolar Friends."

References

2008 debut albums
Johnny Foreigner albums
Nettwerk Records albums
Albums produced by Machine (producer)